The 1999–2000 French Rugby Union Championship was played by 24 teams divided in the preliminary phase in two pool of 12. The first two team of each pool were directly admitted to the quarter finals. The team classified from 3rd to 6th of each pool were admitted to a Barrage round. The four winners were admitted also to the quarter of finals.

Stade Français won the title beating in the final the Colomiers (at the first final of their history). It was the second victory for the Stade Français in the professional era.

Ath the end of the season four team were relegated to lower division: Montauban, Toulon, Racing Paris, Nîmes. There was only one promotion from second division, (Béziers), in order to reduce to 21 the number of clubs in first division in 1999–2000, and 16 in the 2000–01 season.

Teams Participating 

 Agen
 Auch
 Aurillac
 Biarritz
 Bègles-Bordeaux
 Bourgoin
 Brive
 Castres
 Colomiers
 Dax
 Grenoble
 Montauban (promoted)

 Montferrand
 Narbonne
 Nîmes
 Périgueux
 Perpignan
 Racing club de France
 Pau
 Stade Français
 Mont-de-Marsan (promoted)
 La Rochelle
 Toulon
 Toulouse

Preliminary round

Pool 1

Pool 2 

Because of a default of 10 million French francs, the Ligue Nationale de Rugby relegated the June 24, 2000 the RC Toulon in the second division.

A Barrage match was arranged between Aurillac and Racing Paris. It was won by Aurillac, that remain in first division.

Barrage

Quarter of finals

Semifinals

Final

French Rugby Chanmpionship
French rugby union championship
Championship